The 1952–53 Toronto Maple Leafs season was Toronto's 36th season in the National Hockey League (NHL).

Offseason

Regular season

Final standings

Record vs. opponents

Schedule and results

Playoffs

Player statistics

Regular season
Scoring

Goaltending

Awards and records

The Toronto Maple Leafs did not win any NHL awards and no players were selected for the All-Star Teams for the 1952-53 NHL season.

Transactions
The following is a list of all transactions that have occurred for the Toronto Maple Leafs during the 1952–53 NHL season. It lists which team each player has been traded to and for which player(s) or other consideration(s), if applicable.

See also
 1952–53 NHL season

References

External links

Toronto Maple Leafs season, 1952-53
Toronto Maple Leafs seasons
Tor